Marion Airport  is a city-owned, public-use airport located three nautical miles (6 km) east of the central business district of Marion, a city in Linn County, Iowa, United States.

Facilities and aircraft 
Marion Airport covers an area of 40 acres (16 ha) at an elevation of 862 feet (263 m) above mean sea level. It has one runway designated 17/35 with an asphalt and turf surface measuring 3,775 by 100 feet. The width has 26 feet of center pavement, with the remainder being turf.

For the 12-month period ending August 26, 2010, the airport had 11,372 aircraft operations, an average of 31 per day: 99% general aviation, 1% air taxi, and <1% military. At that time there were 51 aircraft based at this airport: 76% single-engine, 8% helicopter, 8% ultralight, 6% multi-engine, and 2% glider.

In October 2019 expansion started to extend the main runway to 3,775 ft. long. It was completed July 28, 2020.

References

External links 
 Marion Airport (C17) at Iowa DOT Airport Directory
 Aerial image as of March 1990 from USGS The National Map

Airports in Iowa
Transportation buildings and structures in Linn County, Iowa
Marion, Iowa